"Día de Suerte" ("Lucky Day") is a Latin pop song by Mexican recording artist Alejandra Guzmán. Produced by Armando Avila, the track was released as the main theme for the Mexican telenovela Una Familia con Suerte. The song was included in the setlist of Guzmán's live album 20 Años de Éxitos En Vivo con Moderatto (2011) and was performed by the singer and Moderatto. The studio version of the track is featured on the album as a bonus track.

"Día de Suerte" has charted within the top ten in the United States and became sixth top ten single for Guzmán on Billboards Latin Pop Songs chart and also reached a peak atop the Mexican Airplay charts. Guzmán performed the track at the TVyNovelas Awards and received nominations for the Premios Oye! and Lo Nuestro.

Background
"Día de Suerte" was written by Mexican singer-songwriter Alejandra Guzmán and José Luis Ortega, produced by Armando Avila, and performed by Guzmán. The song is featured as the main theme for the Mexican telenovela Una Familia con Suerte, produced by Juan Osorio and starred by Arath de la Torre, Mayrín Villanueva and Luz Elena González. The telenovela began its broadcasting on February 14, 2011 and featured Guzmán in a supporting role named Viridiana, in honor of her late sister Viridiana Alatriste. The song was released during the accusations made to the singer of having participated in a narcofiesta circa 2006, to which the singer responded: "I do not care about that [the accusations]."

Recording and release
Guzmán found inspiration for the song at the middle of one night and immediately called Juan Osorio with the news. "It was a song I felt, I gave the best of me, but you never know if the audience would like it." Guzmán said. The song was co-written by José Luis Ortega and produced under the guidance of Armando Avila. During the recording of the live album 20 Años de Éxitos En Vivo con Moderatto, Guzmán performed the song for the first time along the band Moderatto who joined her on stage. On the release of 20 Años de Éxitos the studio version of "Día de Suerte" is included as a bonus track.

Accolades
The track won for Rock Song of the Year at the Premio Lo Nuestro 2012, while the live version, featuring Moderatto, was nominated for Collaboration of the Year. "Día de Suerte" also was nominated for Song of the Year and won for Best Song for Telenovela, Series or Movies at the Mexican Premios Oye!.

Chart performance
"Día de Suerte" reached the top of the Billboard Mexico Airplay chart, and peaked at number nine in the Billboard Latin Songs and number two in the Latin Pop Songs charts, becoming Guzmán's sixth top ten single in the latter chart. For the week of September 24, 2011, Guzmán had two top-ten singles in the Latin Pop Songs chart simultaneously, at number nine "Tan Sólo Tú" (a featured performance with Franco De Vita) and "Día de Suerte" climbing to number two.

Track listing and formats

Digital download
"Día de Suerte" – 3:32

Mexican iTunes EP
"Día de Suerte" – 3:32
"Día de Suerte (featuring Moderatto)" – 4:02
"Día de Suerte (Giuseppe D Radio Remix)" – 3:20

See also
List of number-one songs of 2011 (Mexico)

References

2011 songs
Alejandra Guzmán songs
Spanish-language songs
Telenovela theme songs
Songs written by Alejandra Guzmán
EMI Latin singles
Songs written by José Luis Ortega